Demirtaş is a village in Dikili district of İzmir Province, Turkey. It is situated in the forests between Dikili and Çandarlı. The population of Demirtaş was 287 in 2011.

References

İzmir Province
Villages in Dikili District